Ó Scealláin is the name of an Irish family, originally from County Wexford, derived from a word meaning kernel. It is nowadays rendered as Scallan.

See also

 Mac Scannláin
 Ó Scannláin
 Ó Scannail

References

 The Surnames of Ireland, Edward MacLysaght, p. 17, Dublin, 1978, .

Irish families
Irish-language surnames